Gražina Didžiūnaitytė  (18 January 1940 – 24 October 2008) was a Lithuanian glass artist

See also
List of Lithuanian painters

References
Universal Lithuanian Encyclopedia

1940 births
2008 deaths
20th-century Lithuanian women artists
Glass artists
People from Vilkaviškis District Municipality